Wangũ wa Makeri (c. 1856–1915 or 1936) was a Kikuyu tribal chief, known as a headman, during the British Colonial period in Kenya. She was the only female Kikuyu headman during the period, who later resigned following a scandal in which she engaged in a Kibata dance.

Early life
Wangũ Wa Makeri was born around 1856 in Gitie village to Gatuika Macharia and Wakeru. She had no formal education, instead working on her parents’ farm as a labourer. It was there that she met her husband, Makeri wa Mbogo. Together, they raised their six children in a traditional Kikuyu home in Weithaga, within the modern Central Province of Kenya.

Headman
She entered into a relationship with the paramount chief of Fort Hall (now Murang'a), Karuri wa Gakure, after he stopped on occasion in her village and stayed with the family. Her husband knew about this, and in response was offered the position of headman, which he declined. Instead, Gakure offered the position to Makeri, which she accepted in 1902. This was at a time when the position was exclusively male-only, and Makeri was the only female headman of the Kikuyu during the whole of the British Colonial period.

By this time, the British colonial authorities had begun a taxation system, enforced by other locals. Makeri acted as the go-between for the Kikuyu and these authorities, under which she became a controversial figure to her people. She was later described as an authoritarian tax collector, who would intimidate tax evaders and imprison them in solitary confinement. Makeri would use those people as seats, sitting on their backs as they knelt. She sent one of her sons to the local mission school in 1903.

Resignation
Her relationship with Gakure continued throughout the period in which she was headman. At a meeting between 2 and 4 June 1909, she engaged in a Kibata dance during which her grass skirt fell off leaving her naked. This was an exclusively male warrior dance, and as a result of the scandal, she was forced to resign from office with Ikai wa Gathimba replacing her. One of her sons, Muchiri, would later become headman himself. Makeri died in 1915.  Fred K Kago  the renowned Kikuyu children writer had a more hilarious narrative about Wangu wa Makeri.  Kago wrote that Wangu's reign was brought down by men after making all the women including her pregnant.  In her helpless situation she offered no resistance.

References

Sources

1856 births
1915 deaths
Kikuyu people
20th-century women rulers
Tribal chiefs